Strada means street in Italian, and is a chain of Italian restaurants in the United Kingdom.

Strada may also refer to:

Strada (surname)
Fiat Strada, a compact pickup truck
Mitsubishi Strada. also known as the Mitsubishi Triton, a compact pickup truck
Bizzarrini Strada, an Italian automobile
La Strada, a 1954 Italian film
La Strada (band)
Cesta, Ajdovščina (known in Italian as ), a village in Slovenia
Mitsubishi Triton, alternatively known as Mitsubishi Strada